25 Martin Place (formerly the MLC Centre) is a skyscraper in Sydney, Australia. Originally named the "MLC Centre" after MLC Limited, and still commonly referred to by that name, in 2021 the name was removed by its owner, Dexus, which now refers to the building simply by its street address of 25 Martin Place.

Design and construction
The building's construction was controversial, since it brought about the demolition in 1971-2 of the famous 19th century Australia Hotel, the Theatre Royal, and the splendid Commercial Travellers Club building on the corner of Martin Place, all of which formerly stood on the site.

Designed by architect Harry Seidler, it stands at a height of 228 metres (748 ft) with 67 storeys, and remains one of his most definitive works. The building was awarded the Sir John Sulman Medal by the Australian Institute of Architects. The contractor was Civil & Civic. It was officially opened by the Governer-General, Sir Zelman Cowen, in September 1978.

Location and features
The building is a stark white, modernist column in an octagonal floorplan, with eight massive load-bearing columns in the corners that taper slightly towards the top. It is one of the world's tallest reinforced concrete buildings and was one of the tallest buildings in the world outside North America at the time of its completion. The MLC Centre was Sydney's tallest office building from 1977 to 1992. The MLC Centre is wholly owned by Dexus, which acquired a half-stake in the property from the Queensland Investment Corporation in June 2017 and bought out its former co-owner, the GPT Group, in March 2019. The MLC Centre was also Australia's tallest building for nine years until losing the title to the Rialto Towers in Melbourne in 1986.

Occupants include the Taipei Economic and Cultural Office in Sydney (TECO), Cognizant, Servcorp, and former Prime Minister of Australia, John Howard. The podium of the building includes a shopping centre and a 1,186-seat theatre, the Theatre Royal.

The building underwent a $100m repair project which installed hybrid corrosion protection to the facade. The project retained the original appearance of the structure but remedied damage to exposed aggregate precast concrete facade panels caused by expansive corrosion of steel reinforcement. In June 2021, it was rebranded from the MLC Centre to 25 Martin Place.

In popular culture
The building was the centre of the storyline in the first episode of the Australian television drama, Police Rescue, airing in 1991. Sergeant Steve "Mickey" McClintock (Gary Sweet) is seen abseiling off the top of the building in the first half of the episode to persuade a man threatening to commit suicide not to jump.

Gallery

See also

 List of tallest buildings in Sydney
 Architecture of Sydney

References

External links
 Official site
 Four years and $100m for city tower repair job

Harry Seidler buildings
Skyscrapers in Sydney
Office buildings in Sydney
Skyscraper office buildings in Australia
Retail buildings in New South Wales
Office buildings completed in 1977
Buildings and structures awarded the Sir John Sulman Medal
Martin Place
King Street, Sydney